This article lists important figures and events in Malayan public affairs during the year 1959, together with births and deaths of significant Malayans.

Incumbent political figures

Federal level
Yang di-Pertuan Agong: Tuanku Abdul Rahman of Negeri Sembilan
Raja Permaisuri Agong: Tuanku Kurshiah of Negeri Sembilan
Prime Minister: Tunku Abdul Rahman Putra Al-Haj
Deputy Prime Minister: Datuk Abdul Razak

State level
  Sultan of Johor: 
Sultan Ibrahim (until 1959) 
Sultan Ismail (from 1959)
 Sultan of Kedah: Sultan Abdul Halim Muadzam Shah
 Sultan of Kelantan: Sultan Ibrahim
 Raja of Perlis: Tuanku Syed Putra
 Sultan of Perak: Sultan Yusuf Izzuddin Shah
 Sultan of Pahang: Sultan Abu Bakar
 Sultan of Selangor: Sultan Hisamuddin Alam Shah
 Sultan of Terengganu: Sultan Ismail Nasiruddin Shah
 Yang di-Pertuan Besar of Negeri Sembilan: Tengku Munawir (Regent)
 Yang di-Pertua Negeri (Governor) of Penang: Raja Tun Uda
 Yang di-Pertua Negeri (Governor) of Malacca: Tun Leong Yew Koh

(Source: Malaysian Department of Informations)

Events
 January – La Salle School, Petaling Jaya was established by De La Salle Brothers.
 26 January – The Central Bank of Malaya (Bank Negara Tanah Melayu) was founded.
 19 February – The Election Offences (Amendment) Ordinance 1959 was enacted.
 20 February – Sultan Abdul Halim Muadzam Shah was installed as Sultan of Kedah
 11 March – The Malayan Federation Royal Police Memorial Monument at Police Training Academy (now PULAPOL) Kuala Lumpur was officialized.
 1 April – The Prevention of Crime Act 1959 was enacted.
 24 April – The last meeting of the Federal Legislative Council before being replaced by the Malayan Parliament.
 1 May – The Immigration Ordinance 1959 was enacted.
 8 May – Sultan Ibrahim Al-Masyhur of Johor died at the age of 86 in London, England. His body was brought back to Johor and laid to rest at Mahmoodiah Royal Mausoleum, Johor Bahru. His son, Tunku Ismail was proclaimed as the 23rd Sultan of Johor and 3rd in the modern Sultan of Johor.
 19 August – The 1959 General Elections was held for the first time since independence on 31 August 1957.
 12 September – The first Malayan Parliament was opened by the Yang di-Pertuan Agong.
 12–17 December – Malaya competed at the first edition of the SEA Games in 1959 Southeast Asian Peninsular Games held in Bangkok, Thailand. The Malayan team won 8 gold medals, 15 silver medals, 11 bronze medal and ranked overall at third place.
 Unknown date – Pahang FA was founded.

Sports
 18–26 April – 1959 AFC Youth Championship

Births

6 January – Adnan Abu Hassan – Composer and musician (died 2016)
 5 February – Azhar Mansor – First Malaysian sailoring around the world
 11 April – Md Sirat Abu – Politician
 7 May – Jamal Abdillah – Singer
 13 July – Fuziah Salleh – Politician
 30 July – Al-Sultan Abdullah ibni Sultan Ahmad Shah – 16th Yang di-Pertuan Agong of Malaysia (2019- )  
 6 August – Wan Mohamad Nazarie b. Wan Mahmood – Commissioner of Prison (Operation)
 14 August – Raja Zarith Sofiah – Permaisuri of Johor
 15 September – Bung Mokhtar Radin – Politician
 4 October – Nashrudin Elias (Nash) – Singer and musician
 14 October – Husam Musa – Politician
 4 November – Zainal Abidin Mohamad – Singer
 3 December – Jemilah Mahmood – Physician, humanitarian activist and founder of Mercy Malaysia
 13 December – Imuda – Actor and comedian
 Unknown date – Harun Salim Bachik – Actor (died 2015)
 Unknown date – Abu Bakar Bin Mohamad Diah – Politician
 Unknown date – Noreen Noor – Singer and actress (died 2013)
 Unknown date – Rosnah Mohd Noor – Actress (died 2013)

Deaths
8 May – Sultan Ibrahim of Johor
22 August – William George Maxwell – British Resident of Perak

See also 
 1959 
 1958 in Malaya | 1960 in Malaya
 History of Malaysia

References 

 
Years of the 20th century in Malaysia
Malaya
1950s in Malaya
Malaya